Ismail Merathi (1844–1917) was an Indian Urdu poet, schoolteacher, and educationist from the Mughal–British era. His poems for children like Nasihat,  Barsaat, Humaari Gaye, Subah Ki Aamad, Sach Kaho, Baarish Ka Pehla Qatra, Pan Chakki, Shafaq, and several others are part of the primary school curriculum in Pakistan. He wrote many Urdu and Persian text books for school-going children.

Early life and education
Merathi was born as Muhammad Ismail on November 12, 1844, in Meerath, Mughal India. He was home-schooled by his father Sheikh Piir Bakhsh. Later, he attended a formal school. He received higher education in Persian from Mirza Rahim Baig, a contemporary of Mirza Ghalib. 

In 1868, he was appointed as a Persian teacher in a public school in Saharanpur district. Later, he was transferred to Agra in 1888. In 1899, he retired from the teaching job and returned to his home town Meerath.

Literary career
Merathi started poetry when the Persian language was dominating both literature and culture in the Indian subcontinent. He initially wrote some Persian ghazals but later shifted to Urdu poetry. Influenced by Sir Syed Ahmed Khan's reforming movement and after reading an Urdu translation of some moral poems in English, he was motivated to write inspiring Urdu poems for kids. His first collection of poems Reza-e-Jawahar was published in 1885, which also included some translations from English poems. He also wrote several school textbooks for 1st to 5th-grade students. 

In 1909, he founded a primary school Madrasa tul Banat for girls in Meerath which has been upgraded since then and now exists as Ismail National Mahila (PG) College Meerut.

Style and themes
Merathi uses simple and easy-to-understand words in his poems for children. He expresses moral ideas in plain language and in a realistic tone. He refers to nature (mountains, rivers, dawn, rain, plants, etc.) and pet animals (cat, dog, horse, cow, and others) while conveying a moral message in his poems, thus making them appealing to a child's mind. Truth, hardworking, obedience, positive habits, and strong character are the central values emphasized in his poems.

Personal life
Merathi was married to Bibi Naeem Al-Nisa, daughter of Sheikh Mehboob Bakhsh, in 1862. Both had three sons and two daughters together.

Books
 Reza-e-Jawahar — Collection of poems published in 1885
 Kulliyat-e-Ismail — Collection of poems and ghazals published in 1910
 Urdu Zuban Ka Qayeda — The rule book of Urdu language for beginners
 Urdu Ki Pehli Kitab — The first-grade textbook of Urdu
 Urdu Ki Dosri Kitab — The second-grade textbook of Urdu
 Urdu Ki Teesri Kitab — The third-grade textbook of Urdu
 Urdu Ki Chauthi Kitab — The fourth-grade textbook of Urdu
 Urdu Ki Panchvein Kitab — The fifth-grade textbook of Urdu

Honours
Merathi received the title of "Khan Sahib" for his literary and educational contributions from the British Government in 1912.

Death
Merathi had chronic bronchitis due to heavy tobacco consumption. On November 1, 1917, he passed away at the age of 73 in Meerath.

References

1844 births
1917 deaths
People from Meerut
19th-century Indian poets
20th-century Indian poets
Urdu-language poets
Urdu-language poets from India